Istanbul Sapphire, or Sapphire, is a skyscraper located in the central business district of Levent in Istanbul, Turkey.

It was Istanbul's and Turkey's tallest skyscraper between 2010 and 2016, and the 4th tallest building in Europe when its construction was completed in 2010. Sapphire rises 54 floors above ground level, and has an above-ground roof height of 238 meters: the building has an overall structural height of 261 meters including its spire, which is part of the design and not a radio antenna. Designed by Tabanlıoğlu Architects, it is a shopping and luxury residence mixed-use development managed by Kiler GYO. It is also the country's first ecological skyscraper.
 
As of 2020, Istanbul Sapphire is the 4th tallest skyscraper in Istanbul and Turkey, behind Metropol Istanbul Tower (70 floors / 301 metres including its twin spires) in the Ataşehir district on the Asian side of the city; and the Skyland Istanbul Towers 1 and 2 (2 x 65 floors / 284 metres), located adjacent to Türk Telekom Stadium in the Seyrantepe quarter of the Sarıyer district, on the European side.

History and architecture

Istanbul Sapphire was designed by Tabanlıoğlu Architects as a high-tech structure which consists of 64 floors (54 above-ground and 10 basement floors), communal living floors, extensive parking spaces, a large shopping mall, and 47 floors for residential use.

There are special floors with private gardens between every 3 floors, and every 9 floors are separated from each other by a communal living area or mechanical floors. Design of the gardens are proposed with a number of alternatives and the consistency of garden maintenance is under the residence management company's responsibility.

Turkey's deepest excavated construction pit
The foundation pit excavated for the project – 42.5 meters deep – is the deepest foundation pit excavated for any structure in Turkey.

Construction work
Construction of the project began in 2006 and was completed in 2010. The building's official opening ceremony took place on 4 March 2011.

Companies
The companies involved in the development and construction of the project have included thus far:
 Kiler GYO (investor and developer)
 Güney Turizm (Mustafa Tatlıcı, owner of the plot)
 Biskon Yapı (construction subsidiary of Kiler Holding and the project's main construction company)
 Demsar İnşaat (project's sub-contractor for the structural construction of the skyscraper)
 Tabanlıoğlu Architects (the project's architectural design firm)
 Ruscheweyh Consult GmbH (consulting firm with expertise in wind loads on buildings and structures)

Gallery

See also 
List of tallest buildings in Istanbul
List of tallest buildings in Turkey
List of tallest buildings in Europe

References

External links 

 Istanbul Sapphire (official website)
 Pictures of Istanbul Sapphire

Residential buildings completed in 2009
Residential skyscrapers in Istanbul
Skyscrapers in Istanbul
Istanbul Central Business District
21st-century architecture in Turkey